The Postcard is a 2020 documentary film directed by Asmae El Moudir.

Synopsis 
After discovering an old postcard in her mother's belongings, director Asmae El Moudir embarks on a journey to Zawia, and into the past. She contemplates how different life would be if her mother had never left the remote mountain village.

Cast 

 Oum El Eid Oulkadi
 Touda Oulkadi
 Aicha Farid
 Fatma Farid
 Mohammed Oulkadi

Festivals 

 2021 Stockholm Arab Film Festival
 2021 International Documentary Film Festival Amsterdam
 2021 Malmo Arab Film Festival
 2021 Lessinia Film Festival
 Durban International Film Festival

References

External links 
 

2020 documentary films
2020 films
Moroccan documentary films
2020s Arabic-language films